Sophronica flavoides is a species of beetle in the family Cerambycidae. It was described by Stephan von Breuning in 1961.

References

Sophronica
Beetles described in 1961